Alexander Pietrangelo  (born January 18, 1990) is a Canadian professional ice hockey defenceman and alternate captain for the Vegas Golden Knights of the National Hockey League (NHL). He previously played for the St. Louis Blues for parts of twelve seasons, captaining the Blues for his final four seasons with the franchise. Nicknamed "Petro", as a junior, he played with the Niagara IceDogs and Barrie Colts of the Ontario Hockey League (OHL). Pietrangelo captained the Blues to their first Stanley Cup championship in franchise history in 2019, where he tied the league-lead in the playoffs in assists and notably scored the Stanley Cup-clinching goal in Game 7.

Pietrangelo has competed with Team Canada at the junior and senior level, winning a gold medal win with Canada's under-20 team at the 2009 World Junior Championships. Individually, he was named Best Defenceman at the 2010 World Junior Championship and 2011 Men's World Championship. Pietrangelo was named to the 2014 Canadian Olympic hockey team and won a gold medal at the 2014 Winter Olympics.

Playing career

Minor

Pietrangelo played minor hockey in the Greater Toronto Area when he was growing up. He started to play hockey for the NobleKing Knights, Rep A team and then with the Richmond Hill Stars of the OMHA before playing three years with the Vaughan Kings of the Greater Toronto Hockey League (GTHL). As a novice aged player (nine and under), Pietrangelo and his Toronto Pro Hockey Development teammates participated in the 2000 Brick Super Novice Tournament in Edmonton, Alberta. His teammates included Steven Stamkos, John Tavares, Philip McRae and Michael Del Zotto. Toronto, however, was defeated in the tournament final by the Vancouver Pacific Vipers, on a goal by Jordan Eberle. Pietrangelo was also a member of the All-Ontario Peewee AAA Champion Vaughan Kings team in 2003. He played three years in the Toronto Jr. Canadiens AAA system. The Jr. Canadiens won Ontario's bantam championship in 2005, with Pietrangelo scoring the game-winning goal in the final against the Markham Waxers.

Junior
After his successful minor hockey career, Pietrangelo was drafted third overall by the Ontario Hockey League (OHL)'s Mississauga IceDogs in the first round of the 2006 OHL Priority Selection. He scored at a near point-per-game pace in his rookie season with the IceDogs with 52 points in 59 games, then moved with the team to Niagara as the franchise relocated in 2007.

In September 2007, he was named Canadian Hockey League Player of the Week after recording three goals and four assists in two games. In December 2007, TSN ranked Pietrangelo third overall among eligible skaters for the 2008 NHL Entry Draft. International Scouting Services described Pietrangelo as a "tremendous specimen in terms of size and skills" and ranked him fifth among North American draft prospects at mid-season, then sixth in their final rankings leading up to the Draft. Pietrangelo finishing his second OHL season with 53 points in 60 games.

After the Blues lent him to the Canadian under-20 team for the 2010 World Junior Championships, Pietrangelo was returned to the OHL. During the World Juniors, his OHL rights were traded from the IceDogs to the Barrie Colts. Playing half a season with Barrie, he recorded 29 points in 25 games, while adding 14 points in 17 playoff games. Due to his long playoff run with the Colts, he did not have the opportunity to play in the AHL as he did the previous season.

Professional

St. Louis Blues

Pietrangelo was selected fourth overall by the St. Louis Blues at the Entry Draft on June 20, 2008. Coming into training camp, the Blues signed him to an entry-level contract on September 4, 2008. Pietrangelo earned his way onto the team for opening night and played his first NHL game against the Nashville Predators on October 10, 2008. Three days later, however, he suffered a head injury on October 13 in a game against the Toronto Maple Leafs, when Ryan Hollweg checked him from behind into the boards. Pietrangelo returned shortly, and after playing eight games total for the Blues, he was sent back to his junior team, the Niagara Icedogs. On April 10, 2009, he was assigned to the Blues' top minor league affiliate, the Peoria Rivermen of the American Hockey League (AHL), after his junior season had ended.

Pietrangelo began the 2009–10 season on the Blues' roster for a second consecutive year, but played in only nine games by December 2009. In 2010–11, Pietrangelo played his first full season with the Blues, leading all team defencemen with 43 points (11 goals and 32 assists) over 79 games. He also led team defencemen in plus-minus (+18) and shots (161), while ranking third in average ice time per game. Due to his previous eight- and nine-game seasons in the NHL, he did not qualify as a rookie. Comparatively, the league's leading scorer among rookie defencemen that season was teammate Kevin Shattenkirk, who was born a year earlier than Pietrangelo; he also recorded 43 points.  At the end of the 2011–12 season, Pietrangelo was named to the NHL Second All-Star Team. On September 13, 2013, Pietrangelo agreed to a seven-year, $45 million contract with the Blues. Pietrangelo was again named to the NHL Second All-Star Team during the 2013–14 season.

On August 24, 2016, Pietrangelo was named captain of the Blues. In his second year as captain, he was injured in a game against the Detroit Red Wings on December 9 and was placed on injured reserve until December 19. Despite his setback from injury, Pietrangelo was selected for his first NHL All-Star Game where he won the All-Star passing challenge. Pietrangelo also set a new career-high in points and goals at the conclusion of the regular season. On June 12, 2019, Pietrangelo and the Blues defeated the Boston Bruins to win their first Stanley Cup in franchise history. Pietrangelo scored the cup-winning goal in Game 7 after being set up by Jaden Schwartz. During the 2019 playoffs, Pietrangelo tied with Bruins defenceman Torey Krug for leading the league in assists and lead the league in scoring amongst defenceman.

On December 29, 2019, Pietrangelo got his 326th assist, topping Al MacInnis as the most by a Blues defenseman. Pietrangelo was selected to play in his second All-Star Game, along with Blues teammates Ryan O'Reilly, David Perron and Jordan Binnington.

Vegas Golden Knights
In the final year of his contract with free agency impending, Pietrangelo and the Blues were unable to come to terms on a contract extension. The two parties ultimately broke off negotiations, making Pietrangelo a free agent for the first time in his career. On October 12, 2020, Pietrangelo signed a seven-year, $61.6 million contract with the Vegas Golden Knights.

In 2022, Pietrangelo was named to his third All-Star Game. With help from actor Jon Hamm, Pietrangelo won the Breakaway Challenge portion of the All-Star Skills Competition despite missing both of his shots.

International play

Pietrangelo was picked to play for Team Canada's under-18 team at the 2007 Ivan Hlinka Memorial Tournament, where he served as an alternate captain. The team finished fourth. He played next for the Canadian National Junior Team at the 2009 World Junior Championships and won a gold medal.

The following year, Pietrangelo was loaned by his NHL team, the St. Louis Blues, to play for Team Canada in his second World Junior Championships in 2010. He was selected as an alternate captain to Patrice Cormier. In the final game of the round-robin, Pietrangelo scored a shorthanded game-tying goal against the United States to send the game to overtime. Canada eventually won in a shootout and earned a bye into the semi-final. Advancing to the gold medal game, Canada met the United States in a rematch, but lost 6–5 in overtime. Pietrangelo picked up several individual honours at the conclusion of the tournament. He was named a Tournament All-Star by the media, the Best Defenceman by the directorate and was selected by the coaching staff as one of Canada's top three players.

As the St. Louis Blues failed to make the playoffs in Pietrangelo's first full season in the NHL, he was selected to Canada's men's team for the 2011 IIHF World Championship in Slovakia. With two goals and three assists for five points over seven games, he led Canada in defensive scoring, while tying for second overall among all tournament defencemen. Canada advanced to the quarterfinal as the top-ranked team in their pool, but lost 2–1 to Russia. At the end of the tournament, Pietrangelo was chosen as the Best Defenceman by the directorate. Pietrangelo was part of Canada's gold medal-winning 2014 Winter Olympic team. He played in all six of Canada's games, contributing one assist.

On October 3, 2021, Pietrangelo was one of the first three players named to the men's hockey roster for Canada's team for the 2022 Winter Olympics in Beijing, alongside Sidney Crosby and Connor McDavid. However, due to the NHL's subsequent decision not to attend the Beijing Games as a result of the Omicron variant's impacts on scheduling, Pietrangelo was unable to compete.

Personal life
Pietrangelo was born to parents Joe and Edy, and raised along with his older brother David in King City. His father is the cousin of former NHL goaltender Frank Pietrangelo. Pietrangelo married St. Louis native Jayne in July 2016. In June 2017, he and his wife lost a son due to complications with the pregnancy. They had triplets in July 2018. The couple had their fourth child, a girl in September 2020.

As a child, Pietrangelo's friend died of cancer. As an adult, his niece was diagnosed with Wilms' tumor, but survived. This led him to partner with Friends of Kids with Cancer to raise funds and awareness for youth living with cancer.

Career statistics

Regular season and playoffs
Bold indicates led league

International

Awards and achievements

References

External links

1990 births
Canadian ice hockey centres
Canadian people of Italian descent
Ice hockey people from Ontario
Ice hockey players at the 2014 Winter Olympics
Living people
Medalists at the 2014 Winter Olympics
Mississauga IceDogs players
National Hockey League All-Stars
National Hockey League first-round draft picks
Niagara IceDogs players
Olympic gold medalists for Canada
Olympic ice hockey players of Canada
Olympic medalists in ice hockey
Peoria Rivermen (AHL) players
Sportspeople from King, Ontario
St. Louis Blues draft picks
St. Louis Blues players
Stanley Cup champions
Vegas Golden Knights players